Aryamehr was the title used in the Pahlavi dynasty by Shahanshah Mohammad Reza Shah of Iran. It means Light of the Aryans.

History
Aryamehr was granted as a secondary title by a session of the joint Houses of Parliament (Majles) on 15 September 1965 to Mohammad Reza Pahlavi, the last Shah of Iran (reigning since he took the oath at the Majles on 17 September 1941), before his coronation at Teheran, 26 October 1967. The Pahlavis used it as an idealization of pre-Islamic Iran and foundation for anti-clerical monarchism, while the clerics used it to exalt "Iranian values" vis-à-vis Westernization. Demonstrating affinity with Orientalist views of the alleged "supremacy" of the Aryan peoples and the "mediocrity" of the Semitic peoples, Iranian nationalist discourse idealized pre-Islamic Achaemenid and Sassanid empires, whilst negating the Islamization of Persia during Islamic Caliphate era.

In 1965, the Shah ordered Mohammad Ali Mojtahedi to establish Aryamehr University of Technology. However, after the 1979 revolution It was renamed and currently known as the Sharif university named after Majid Sharif-Vaghefi.

Associated order

In 1873 Naser al-Din Shah Qajar of Qajar dynasty established the order of Aftab (order of the sun) restricted to female sovereigns or consorts (1st class) and princess ladies or women of high rank (2nd class). In 1939 the order was renamed to Nishan-I-khorschid. and finally the order was transformed into the Neshān-e Āryāmehr, Nešâne Āryāmehr or Nishān-i Āryāmehr, meaning 'the Order of Light of the Aryans' it become the third and last Imperial order of knighthood founded by the Shah on 26 September 1967  in honour of his consort, Empress Farah Diba, and restricted to ladies only. The first class was restricted to female Sovereigns or consorts of reigning rulers, the second class to princesses.

See also
 Order of Aftab

References

Notes

References

Mohammad Reza Pahlavi
History of Iran
Heads of state
Royal titles
Noble titles
Insignia
Titles in Iran